Jutal (Urdu,) is a village in the district Gilgit at a distance of 30km from Gilgit city. The world's highest paved road, KKH, passes through the village. In the south of the village is a small settlement, formed by migrant families affected during sectarian tension of 1988, called Jagot colony.

See also
Gilgit City
Nomal

References 

Populated places in Gilgit District